Sir John Ambrose Fleming FRS (29 November 1849 – 18 April 1945) was an English electrical engineer and physicist who invented the first thermionic valve or vacuum tube, designed the radio transmitter with which the first transatlantic radio transmission was made, and also established the right-hand rule used in physics.

He was the eldest of seven children of James Fleming DD (died 1879), a Congregational minister, and his wife Mary Ann, at Lancaster, Lancashire, and baptised on 11 February 1850. A devout Christian, he once preached at St Martin-in-the-Fields in London on evidence for the resurrection.

In 1932, he and Douglas Dewar and Bernard Acworth helped establish the Evolution Protest Movement. Fleming bequeathed much of his estate to Christian charities, especially those for the poor. He was a noted photographer, painted watercolours, and enjoyed climbing the Alps.

Early years
Ambrose Fleming was born in Lancaster and educated at Lancaster Royal Grammar School, University College School, London, and then University College London, where he obtained a BSc in 1870. He entered St John's College, Cambridge in 1877, gaining a DSc from the University of London in 1879 and a BA from Cambridge in 1881, before becoming a fellow of St John's in 1883. He went on to lecture at several universities including the University of Cambridge, University College Nottingham, and University College London, where he was the first professor of electrical engineering. He was also a consultant to the Marconi Wireless Telegraph Company, Swan Company, Ferranti, Edison Telephone, and later the Edison Electric Light Company. In 1892, Fleming presented an important paper on electrical transformer theory to the Institution of Electrical Engineers in London.

Education and marriages

Fleming started school at about the age of ten, attending a private school where he particularly enjoyed geometry. Prior to that his mother tutored him and he had learned, virtually by heart, a book called the Child's Guide to Knowledge, a popular book of the day – even as an adult he would quote from it. His schooling continued at the University College School where, although accomplished at maths, he habitually came bottom of the class at Latin.

Even as a boy he wanted to become an engineer. At 11 he had his own workshop where he built model boats and engines. He even built his own camera, the start of a lifelong interest in photography. Training to become an engineer was beyond the family's financial resources, but he reached his goal via a path that alternated education with paid employment.

Fleming enrolled for a BSc degree at University College London, graduated in 1870, and studied under the mathematician Augustus De Morgan and the physicist George Carey Foster. He became a student of chemistry at the Royal College of Science in South Kensington in London (now Imperial College). There he first studied Alessandro Volta's battery, which became the subject of his first scientific paper. This was the first paper to be read to the new Physical Society of London (now the Institute of Physics) and appears on page one of volume one of their Proceedings.

Financial problems again forced him to work for a living and in the summer of 1874 he became science master at Cheltenham College, a public school, earning £400 per year. (He later also taught at Rossall School.) His own scientific research continued and he corresponded with James Clerk Maxwell at Cambridge University. After saving £400, and securing a grant of £50 a year, in October 1877 at the age of 27, he once again enrolled as a student, this time at Cambridge.

He was among the two or perhaps three University students who attended Maxwell's last Course. Maxwell's lectures, he admitted, were difficult to follow. Maxwell, he said, often appeared obscure and had "a paradoxical and allusive way of speaking". On occasions Fleming was the only student at those lectures. Fleming again graduated, this time with a First Class Honours degree in chemistry and physics. He then obtained a DSc from London and served one year at Cambridge University as a demonstrator of mechanical engineering before being appointed as the first Professor of Physics and Mathematics at University College Nottingham, but he left after less than a year.

On 11 June 1887, he married Clara Ripley (1856/7–1917), daughter of Walter Freake Pratt, a solicitor from Bath. On 27 July 1928 he married the popular young singer Olive May Franks (b. 1898/9), of Bristol, daughter of George Franks, a Cardiff businessman.

Activities and achievements

After leaving the University of Nottingham in 1882, Fleming took up the post of "electrician" to the Edison Electrical Light Company, advising on lighting systems and the new Ferranti alternating current systems. In 1884 Fleming joined University College London taking up the Chair of Electrical Technology, the first of its kind in England. Although this offered great opportunities, he recalls in his autobiography that the only equipment provided to him was a blackboard and piece of chalk. In 1897 the Pender Laboratory was founding at University College London and Fleming took up the Pender Chair after the £5000 was endowed as a memorial to John Pender, the founder of Cable and Wireless.

In 1899 Guglielmo Marconi, the inventor of radiotelegraphy, decided to attempt transatlantic radio communication. This would require a scale-up in power from the small 200–400 watt transmitters Marconi had used up to then. He contracted Fleming, an expert in power engineering, to design the radio transmitter. Fleming designed the world's first large radio transmitter, a complicated spark transmitter powered by a 25 kW alternator driven by a combustion engine, built at Poldhu in Cornwall, UK, which transmitted the first radio transmission across the Atlantic on 12 December 1901.

Although Fleming was responsible for the design, the director of the Marconi Co. had made Fleming agree that: "If we get across the Atlantic, the main credit will be and must forever be Mr. Marconi's". Accordingly, the worldwide acclaim that greeted this landmark accomplishment went to Marconi, who only credited Fleming along with several other Marconi employees, saying he did some work on the "power plant". Marconi also forgot a promise to give Fleming 500 shares of Marconi stock if the project was successful. Fleming was bitter about his treatment. He honoured his agreement and did not speak about it throughout Marconi's life, but after his death in 1937 said Marconi had been "very ungenerous".

In 1904, working for the Marconi company to improve transatlantic radio reception, Fleming invented the first thermionic vacuum tube, the two-electrode diode, which he called the oscillation valve, for which he received a patent on 16 November. It became known as the Fleming valve. The Supreme Court of the United States later invalidated the patent because of an improper disclaimer and, additionally, maintained the technology in the patent was known art when filed.

This invention is often considered to have been the beginning of electronics, for this was the first vacuum tube. Fleming's diode was used in radio receivers and radars for many decades afterwards, until it was superseded by solid state electronic technology more than 50 years later.

In 1906, Lee De Forest of the US added a control "grid" to the valve to create an amplifying vacuum tube RF detector called the Audion, leading Fleming to accuse him of infringing his patents. De Forest's tube developed into the triode the first electronic amplifier. The triode was vital in the creation of long-distance telephone and radio communications, radars, and early electronic digital computers (mechanical and electro-mechanical digital computers already existed using different technology). The court battle over these patents lasted for many years with victories at different stages for both sides. Fleming also contributed in the fields of photometry, electronics, wireless telegraphy (radio), and electrical measurements. He coined the term power factor to describe the true power flowing in an AC power system.

Fleming retired from University College London in 1927 at the age of 77. He remained active, becoming a committed advocate of the new technology of Television which included serving as the second president of the Television Society. He was knighted in 1929, and died at his home in Sidmouth, Devon in 1945. His contributions to electronic communications and radar were of vital importance in winning World War II. Fleming was awarded the IRE Medal of Honor in 1933 for "the conspicuous part he played in introducing physical and engineering principles into the radio art". A note from eulogy at the Centenary celebration of the invention of the thermionic valve:
One century ago, in November 1904, John Ambrose Fleming FRS, Pender Professor at UCL, filed  in Great Britain, for a device called the Thermionic Valve. When inserted together with a galvanometer, into a tuned electrical circuit, it could be used as a very sensitive rectifying detector of high frequency wireless currents, known as radio waves. It was a major step forward in the 'wireless revolution'.
In November 1905, he patented the "Fleming Valve". As a rectifying diode, and forerunner to the triode valve and many related structures, it can also be considered to be the device that gave birth to modern electronics.

In the ensuing years, valves quickly superseded "cat's whiskers" and were the main device used to create the electronics industry of today. They remained dominant until the transistor took dominance in the early 1970s.

Today, descendants of the original valve (or vacuum tube) still play an important role in a range of applications. They can be found in the power stages of radio and television transmitters, in musical instrument amplifiers (particularly electric guitar and bass amplifiers), in some high-end audio amplifiers, as detectors of optical and short wavelength radiation, and in sensitive equipment that must be "radiation-hard".

In 1941 the London Power Company commemorated Fleming by naming a new 1,555 GRT coastal collier SS Ambrose Fleming.

On 27 November 2004 a Blue Plaque presented by the Institute of Physics was unveiled at the Norman Lockyer Observatory, Sidmouth, to mark 100 years since the invention of the Thermionic Radio Valve.

Lectures
In 1894 and 1917 Ambrose Fleming was invited to deliver the Royal Institution Christmas Lecture on The Work of an Electric Current and Our Useful Servants : Magnetism and Electricity respectively.

Books by Fleming
Electric Lamps and Electric Lighting: A course of four lectures on electric illumination delivered at the Royal Institution of Great Britain (1894) 228 pages, .
The Alternate Current Transformer in Theory and Practice "The Electrician" Printing and Publishing Company (1896)
Magnets and Electric Currents E. & F. N. Spon. (1898)
A Handbook for the Electrical Laboratory and Testing Room "The Electrician" Printing and Publishing Company (1901)
Waves and Ripples in Water, Air, and Aether MacMillan (1902).
The Evidence of Things Not Seen Christian Knowledge Society: London (1904)
The Principles of Electric Wave Telegraphy (1906), Longmans Green, London, 671 pages.
The Propagation of Electric Currents in Telephone and Telegraph Conductors (1908) Constable, 316 pages.
An Elementary Manual of Radiotelegraphy and Radiotelephony (1911) Longmans Green, London, 340 pages.
On the power factor and conductivity of dielectrics when tested with alternating electric currents of telephonic frequency at various temperatures  (1912) Gresham, 82 pages, ASIN: B0008CJBIC
The Wonders of Wireless Telegraphy : Explained in simple terms for the non-technical reader Society for promoting Christian Knowledge (1913)
The Wireless Telegraphist's Pocket Book of Notes, Formulae and Calculations The Wireless Press (1915)
The Thermionic Valve and its Development in Radio Telegraphy and Telephony (1919).
Fifty Years of Electricity The Wireless Press (1921)
Electrons, Electric Waves and Wireless telephony The Wireless Press (1923)
Introduction to Wireless Telegraphy and Telephony Sir Isaac Pitman and Sons Ltd. (1924)
Mercury-arc Rectifiers and Mercury-vapour Lamps London. Pitman (1925)
The Electrical Educator (3 volumes), The New Era Publishing Co Ltd (1927)
Memories of a Scientific life Marshall, Morgan & Scott (1934)
Evolution or Creation? (1938) Marshall Morgan and Scott, 114 pages, ASIN: B00089BL7Y – outlines objections to Darwin.
Mathematics for Engineers George Newnes Ltd (1938)
Physics for Engineers George Newnes Ltd (1941)

References

External links

IEEE History Center biography
Department of Electronic & Electrical Engineering, UCL – home of the original Fleming valve
100 Years of Electronics 2004 – The Centenary of the Fleming Valve
Life and Times of Ambrose Fleming
Fleming Book Collection at University College London

1849 births
1945 deaths
British creationists
People from Lancaster, Lancashire
People from Maida Vale
English physicists
English electrical engineers
English inventors
English knights
Academics of University College London
Academics of the University of Nottingham
Alumni of University College London
Alumni of St John's College, Cambridge
IEEE Medal of Honor recipients
European amateur radio operators 
Fellows of the Royal Society
People educated at University College School
History of radio
Alumni of the Royal College of Science
Knights Bachelor
People educated at Lancaster Royal Grammar School